Arianne Hartono and Olivia Tjandramulia were the defending champions but chose not to participate.

Ángela Fita Boluda and Arantxa Rus won the title, defeating Elina Avanesyan and Diana Shnaider in the final, 6–4, 6–4.

Seeds

Draw

Draw

References

External links
Main Draw

ITF World Tennis Tour Maspalomas - Doubles